Herbert Eiteljörge (27 November 1934 – 2 October 2014) was a German goalkeeper.

Career
Eiteljörge began his career in 1953 at Duisburger SpV. After Duisburger's promotion to the Oberliga West, he played 20 games for the club during the 1954/55 season. After that, he signed for SC Preußen Münster. After one season, Eiteljörge featured in almost every game and completed a further 184 games in the Oberliga.

After the Bundesliga was established, which Preußen Münster had qualified for, Eiteljörge was still the first-choice goalkeeper and played in 26 of the 30 Bundesliga games that season for Preußen. The other four games saw Dieter Feller play. Neither of them were able to prevent the team's relegation.

Subsequently, Herbert Eiteljörge featured in 40 games in the Regionalliga West. Until 1969, he was a part of the Münster team.

After his active career, he coached Lüner SV  among others and was the referee's supervisor for SC Preußen Münster.

References

1934 births
2014 deaths
German footballers
Association football goalkeepers
SC Preußen Münster players
German footballers needing infoboxes